Charlie Davis (March 15, 1927 − March 17, 2016) was a baseball player for the Negro leagues. He was scouted by Buck O'Neil to play for the Birmingham Black Barons but was traded to the Memphis Red Sox where he played his career from 1950 to 1955. He earned the name "whip" from Charlie Pride.  Davis played in the 1953 East-West All Star Game, relieving Satchel Paige He later managed the Rockdale Rawhides. In 2008, he was drafted by the Cincinnati Reds in a special MLB draft for former Negro league baseball players.

He died March 17, 2016, leaving behind three daughters, and seven grandchildren.

References

1927 births
2016 deaths
African-American baseball managers
African-American baseball coaches
African-American baseball players
Memphis Red Sox players
20th-century African-American sportspeople
Baseball pitchers
21st-century African-American people